The National Individual Chess Championship is organized by the Nepal Chess Association, and was first held in 1979. A National Women's Individual Chess Championship has also been held since 2008. From the year of 2009 National Club Team Chess Championship has been started.

National Individual Chess Championship Winners
{| class="sortable wikitable"
! !! Year !! Place !! Champion
|-
| 1  || 1979    || Kathmandu                    ||Bijay Sharma
|-
| 2  || 1980    || Dhangadhi, Kailali       ||Bijay Sharma
|-
| 3  || 1981    || Kathmandu                    ||Laxmi Prasad Nakarmi
|-
| 4  || 1982    || Jumla           ||Bikash Man Lama
|-
| 5  || 1983    || Pokhara, Kaski           ||Gopal Prajapati
|-
| 6  || 1984    || Biratnagar, Morang       ||Gopal Prajapati
|-
| 7  || 1985    || Birganj, Parsa           ||Rabin Rajbhandari
|-
| 8  || 1986    || Lalitpur                     ||Badrilal Nepali
|-
| 9  || 1988    || Kusma, Parbat                ||Naveen Tandukar
|-
| 10 || 1992    || Kathmandu                    ||Bilamlal Shrestha
|-
| 11 || 1997    || Kathmandu                    ||Punyaman Karmacharya
|-
| 12 || 1999    || Hetauda, Makwanpur       ||Badrilal Nepali
|-
| 13 || 2004    || Bhaktapur                    ||Digesh Shankar Malla
|-
| 14 || 2006    || Kakarvitta, Jhapa        ||Keshav Shrestha
|-
| 15 || 2008    || Lalitpur                     ||Surbir Lama
|-
| 16 || 2009    || Jawalakhel, Lalitpur     ||Badrilal Nepali
|-
| 17 || 2012    || Mahendranagar, Kanchanpur||Manish Hamal
|-
| 18 || 2014    || Banepa, Kavre            ||Keshav Shrestha
|-
| 19 || 2016/05 || Ilam                         ||Bhupendra Niraula
|-
| 20 || 2016/12 || Dhankuta                     ||Madan Krishna Kayastha
|-
| 21 || 2019/04 || Thakurdwara, Bardiya     ||Purusottam Chaulagain
|}

National Women's Individual Chess Championship winners
{| class="sortable wikitable"
! !! Year !! Place !! Champion
|-
| 1  || 2008    || Kathmandu        ||Monalisha Khamboo
|-
| 2  || 2011    || Kathmandu         ||Tara Ghale
|-
| 3  || 2014    || Banepa,Kavre            ||Bina Jaiswal
|-
| 4  || 2016/05 || Ilam ||Sindira Joshi
|-
| 5  || 2016/12 || Dhankuta         ||Monalisha Khamboo
|-
| 6  || 2019/04 || Thakurdwara,Bardiya          ||Sujana Lohani
|}

References

Chess in Nepal
Chess national championships
Women's chess national championships
Chess
Recurring sporting events established in 1979
Recurring sporting events established in 2008
Chess
Chess
1979 in chess
2008 in chess